Miyazaki is a Japanese surname. Notable people with the surname include:

Aoi Miyazaki (born 1985), Japanese actress
Ayumi Miyazaki (born 1971), Japanese singer and songwriter
Daisuke Miyazaki (born 1981), Japanese team handball player
Gorō Miyazaki (born 1967), son of Hayao Miyazaki; filmmaker, and landscaper
Hayao Miyazaki (born 1941), Japanese animator
, Japanese Nordic combined skier
Hidetaka Miyazaki, video game director, President of FromSoftware
, Japanese footballer
, Japanese high jumper
Manabu Miyazaki (born 1945), Japanese writer
Manabu Miyazaki (photographer) (born 1949), Japanese wildlife photographer
Masajiro Miyazaki (1899–1984), Japanese-Canadian osteopath
Miho Miyazaki (born 1993), Japanese idol singer, AKB48 member
Norihiko Miyazaki (born 1969), Japanese volleyball player
Osamu Miyazaki (born 1966), Japanese motorcycle Grand Prix champion
Shinji Miyazaki (born 1956), composer
, Japanese footballer
Toyotaro Miyazaki (born 1944), American karateka
Tsutomu Miyazaki (1962–2008), Japanese cannibalistic serial killer and necrophile
, Japanese ice hockey player
Yoshinobu Miyazaki (born 1978), Japanese breaststroke swimmer
Yuriko Miyazaki (born 1995), Japanese-British tennis player

Fictional characters
Miko Miyazaki, a character from The Order of the Stick
Nodoka Miyazaki, a character from the manga and anime series Negima! Magister Negi Magi

See also
George Miyasaki, artist and art educator

Japanese-language surnames